Neki Adipi (born 15 May 1984) is a French Guianan professional footballer who plays as a forward for AS Étoile Matoury. He made 11 appearances and scored 1 goal for the French Guiana national team from 2012 to 2015.

International career
Adipi was an international for French Guiana, scoring one goal in 2014 against Curaçao.

International goals
Scores and results list French Guiana's goal tally first.

References

External links
 
 

1984 births
Living people
French Guianan footballers
French footballers
French Guiana international footballers
2014 Caribbean Cup players
Sportspeople from Cayenne
Association football forwards
Olympique Saumur FC players
Les Herbiers VF players
Championnat National players
Ligue 2 players
Championnat National 2 players
Championnat National 3 players